The Mamonovka or Banovka is a river between Russia (Kaliningrad Oblast) and Poland (Warmian-Masurian Voivodship).  It flows into the Vistula Lagoon. It is 51 km long and has a 311 km2 drainage basin.

The Ignatievka River and the Vitushka River are tributaries of the Mamonovka.

External links
 Mamonovka in map

Rivers of Kaliningrad Oblast
Rivers of Poland
Rivers of Warmian-Masurian Voivodeship
Drainage basins of the Baltic Sea